Waranya Chaikantree (born 5 December 1987) is a Thai footballer who plays as a midfielder. She has been a member of the Thailand women's national team.

International career
Waranya capped for Thailand at senior level during the 2010 AFC Women's Asian Cup.

International goals

References

1987 births
Living people
Waranya Chaikantree
Women's association football midfielders
Waranya Chaikantree
Footballers at the 2010 Asian Games